Skegby is a village and former civil parish, now in the unparished area of Sutton in Ashfield, in the Ashfield district of Nottinghamshire, England, located two miles west of Mansfield and one mile north of Sutton-in-Ashfield, close to Stanton Hill lying on the B6014 road. Skegby sits on both sides of a deep valley near the source of the River Meden. The parish covered about 1,433 acres and used to include the then hamlet of Stanton Hill. In 1931 the parish had a population of 6519.

History
The name of Skegby has a similar origin to the name of Skegness – originating from a Dane named Skeggi ("bearded one"). Skegby is mentioned in the Domesday Book as "a berewick of the King's manor at Mansfield". Skegby manor house (which is now in ruins) is located on Mansfield Road. In 1223 Godfrey Spigurnal became Lord of the Manor of Skegby. His descendants held the estate until 1334 when Elizabeth Spigurnal, who married Thomas Gobion, disposed of it to Richard Pensax. His descendant passed it to Percival Lindley in 1450 which was the beginning of the three hundred-year tenure of the Lindley family as Lords of the Manor. The estate passed to John Dodsley in 1820 and the Dodsley family remained in Skegby until the 1930s. The last Manorial Court was held in Skegby Hall on 25 April 1924. The current Lord of the Manor is Dominic Vernon Dodsley Williams, who currently resides in Carmarthenshire.

Francis White's "Directory of Nottinghamshire," of 1853 tells us that Skegby had "an extensive coal mine, and several limestone quarries and kilns" and that in the 1800s "stocking-making was a common occupation." According to White, Skegby celebrated its Village Feast on the Sunday after 10 July.

The Anglican church was built in the Norman period, prior to 1571 and was formerly a chapelry to Mansfield. The church was restored and enlarged in 1870. In 1844 a Wesleyan Methodist chapel was built, with a "Free Church" being built in 1863. In 1865 a National School for both boys and girls was built in Skegby village and a Baptist chapel was built in 1877. On 1 April 1953 the parish was abolished and merged with Sutton in Ashfield.

Areas of interest

Several old buildings and features can be found in Skegby, including the Pinfold on Mansfield Road, which dates from the 18th century, the Troughs on Old Road, which are thought to be over 200 years old, the 17th century Quaker House on Mansfield Road, the 16th century Kruck Cottage and Skegby Hall, which was built in 1720 on the site of a much earlier dwelling.

The Skegby Heritage Trail, (not to be confused with the Skegby Trail), which takes in places of historical interest around the village of Skegby, including Skegby Hall Gardens (currently under restoration), and the Manor House, was launched in October 2009 by the Skegby Appreciation Society. The heritage trail included nine sites in Skegby, such as the 13th Century Skegby Manor House, 16th Century Kruck Cottage and the 17th Century Quaker House. 

The Quaker House was linked to Elizabeth Hooton, one of the founders of the Quakers movement in the United Kingdom. Elizabeth is said to be the first woman Quaker.    It is here that Elizabeth met George Fox founder of the Quakers. 

The Skegby Trail is a former railway track used by cyclists as an off-road track and as a nature trail by walkers which can be accessed from Buttery Lane in Skegby and ends at Chesterfield Road in Pleasley. From this trail the Teversal Trails, which form part of the Pleasley Trails Network may be accessed via the Link Trail between Skegby and Teversal.

Skegby Hall

The hall became a Grade II listed building from 1989. After private residential ownership, it was used from the late 1940s  as an approved school for boys, later becoming a care home with education. It was converted into residential flatlets in 1992. It gained notoriety in the 2000s after multiple allegations of child abuse, with police investigations Daybreak, launched in 2010, followed by Xeres in 2014.

Modern Skegby

Skegby has a number of small shops, off-licences, take away food outlets, hair salons and a petrol station. Other amenities which can be found in Skegby include a small library which is shared with the nearby village of Stanton Hill and the Woodside Medical Surgery and Pharmacy.

There are five pubs in Skegby – the Forest Tavern on Forest Road, the Fox & Crown on Dalestorth Road, the Maypole on Dawgates Lane and the Rifle Volunteer on Forest Road, as well as the Triple S Snooker and Social Club on Mansfield Road.

Schools
Skegby also has two primary schools, Healdswood Infant and Nursery School on Barker Avenue and St. Andrew's C of E Primary School on Mansfield Road.

Churches
There are two churches in Skegby, St Andrews Church and Skegby Methodist Church on Mansfield Road Skegby.

See also
Listed buildings in Skegby
 Skegby Rural District

External links
 http://www.skegbyappreciationsociety.co.uk
 https://web.archive.org/web/20111003105322/http://www.lindleyancestry.co.uk/lindley_of_skegby_nottinghamshir.htm
 http://www.nottinghamshire.gov.uk/home/environment/countryside/nature_conservation/greenspaces/ourlnrs.htm
 Pleasley and Teversal trails at Notts County Council

References

 White's "Directory of Nottinghamshire," 1853
 The story of Skegby and Stanton Hill, by W Clay-Dove, 1984

Villages in Nottinghamshire
Former civil parishes in Nottinghamshire
Sutton-in-Ashfield